Wonsu is the highest military rank in the armed forces of North Korea and South Korea.

Historical 
The title of Wonsu or its variations had been used as the title of high-ranking military commanders in Korean history since Goryeo Dynasty onward.  For example, Gwon Yul, a famous general in 16th century who rose to the supreme command of Korean forces during Imjin War held the title of "Do-Wonsu", roughly translated as "high marshal".

North Korea 

Wonsu is a rank in the Korean People's Army of North Korea, equivalent to marshal in other armies. This rank is held by all Supreme Leaders of the DPRK.

While he was the Supreme Commander of the Korean People's Army, Kim Il-sung became North Korea's first marshal during the Korean War by the decision of the Supreme People's Assembly, the unicameral parliament of North Korea, on February 4, 1953. Period photographic evidence demonstrates that the early marshal shoulder board rank insignia was the same as that of the current vice marshal shoulder boards (a large star overlain with the Democratic People's Republic of Korea coat-of-arms).

The rank of vice marshal (chasu) is unique to the North Korean ranking system. Vice marshal was first conferred in February 1953 on Choe Yong-gon. Sources suggest that the shoulder board rank insignia for marshal and vice marshal then became a single large star without the state coat-of-arms (for marshals) and the state coat-of-arms without a star (for vice marshals). By the time the next conferral of rank to vice marshal was awarded (1985), the shoulder board rank insignia for marshal and vice marshal had taken on their current design.

The next change in the DPRK marshal ranks took place in 1992 when the rank of dae wonsu or grand marshal (full title grand marshal of the Democratic People's Republic of Korea) was created for Kim Il-sung. At this time the rank of marshal was divided into two ranks: the rank of marshal with the title "marshal of the Democratic People's Republic of Korea" (konghwaguk wonsu) was conferred upon Kim Il-sung's son Kim Jong-il, and the same rank but with the title "marshal of the Korean People's Army" was conferred upon O Jin-u. In 1995, two other military officers were conferred the rank of marshal with the title "marshals of the Korean People's Army", i.e. Choe Kwang and Ri Ul-sol. Insignia of rank of the two grades of marshal are different (with the insignia for marshal of the Democratic People's Republic of Korea being more like that of grand marshal—the grand marshal insignia has a larger wreath encompassing the marshal's star—but is smaller as it is below the star itself).

Also, in 1992 eight other generals were promoted to vice marshal at which time in North Korea there was one grand marshal, one marshal of the Democratic People's Republic of Korea, one marshal of the Korean People's Army and eight vice marshals.

The rank (as marshal of the DPRK) was bestowed to Kim Jong-un in 2012.

On April 15, 2016, Kim Yong-chun and Hyon Chol-hae were promoted to the rank of Marshal of the Korean People's Army, the first promotions of active duty officers after 21 years.

Insignia

List of Marshals of the Democratic People's Republic of Korea

List of Marshals of the Korean People's Army

South Korea

, known in English as "General of the Army of the Republic of Korea" or "Admiral of the Fleet of the Republic of Korea", is the highest military rank of the Republic of Korea (ROK) armed forces and is the combined equivalent of a field marshal, fleet admiral and marshal of the Air Force in other nations.

While the rank insignia for the Navy remains the same the sleeve insignia for a naval officer promoted to the rank is the same sleeve insignia of Fleet admiral used in the United States Navy.

Homophone
Coincidentally, wonsu is also a word meaning "mortal enemy" (怨讐). The two words have different etymologies and hanja, but in South Korea are homophonous and so are written identically in hangul. In North Korea, the government has addressed the issue by changing the word for "enemy" to "wonssu" (원쑤).

See also

Yuan Shuai, the Chinese equivalent, written identically in Hanja/Hanzi
Republic of Korea Armed Forces
Korean People's Army
Six-star rank

References

Citations

Sources 
 

Military ranks of South Korea
Military ranks of North Korea
Five-star officers